Reichenfels is a town in the district of Wolfsberg in the Austrian state of Carinthia.

Geography
Reichenfels lies in the upper Lavant River valley between the Packalp and the Seetal Alps on the boundary with Styria. Neighbouring municipalities in Carinthia are Bad Sankt Leonhard and Hüttenberg.

References

Cities and towns in Wolfsberg District